Batocera gerstaeckerii is a species of beetle in the family Cerambycidae. It was described by Thomson in 1865. It is known from the Moluccas.

References

Batocerini
Beetles described in 1865
Beetles of Asia